Helle Ploug is marine scientist known for her work on particles in seawater. She is a professor at the University of Gothenburg, and was named a fellow of the Association for the Sciences of Limnology and Oceanography in 2017.

Education and career 
Ploug grew up in Denmark. She has an M.Sc. (1992) and a Ph.D. (1996) from Aarhus University. Following her Ph.D. she did postdoctoral work at the Max Planck Institute for Marine Microbiology and the University of Copenhagen. Starting in 2006 she was a scientist at the Alfred Wegener Institute for Polar and Marine Research, and in 2008 she moved to Stockholm University where she had a Marie Curie fellowship. In 2006 she became an associate professor at the University of Gothenburg where she was promoted to professor in 2013.

Research 
Ploug's early research used fiber optic sensors to measure light in marine sediments. She went on to examine how particles assemble in marine systems. Her work on particles includes developing methods to quantify bacterial use of particles, and the implications for consumption of particles produced by copepods. Ploug has developed methods to measure how fast particles sink through the ocean and the rate sinking particles are converted into carbon dioxide. Her recent research has focused on measurements of biogeochemical cycling at the single cell level using Nanoscale secondary ion mass spectrometry.

Selected publications

Awards and honors 
In 2017 Ploug was named a fellow of the Association for the Sciences of Limnology and Oceanography.

References

External links 

 

Living people
Women climatologists
Aarhus University alumni
Academic staff of the University of Gothenburg
Women oceanographers
Biogeochemists
Year of birth missing (living people)